World Steel Association, often abbreviated as worldsteel, is the international trade body for the iron and steel industry. The association  is one of the largest and most dynamic industry associations in the world, with members in every major steel-producing country. worldsteel represents steel producers, national and regional steel industry associations, and steel research institutes. Members represent around 85% of global steel production.

It is a non-profit organisation with its headquarters in Brussels, Belgium and a second office in Beijing, China, whose purpose is to promote steel and the steel industry to customers, the industry, media and the general public.

Membership

Companies must produce at least 2 million tonnes of steel and operate as independent commercial enterprises in order to be eligible for regular membership.

The World Steel Association publishes a list of the top steel-producing companies every year.

Areas of activity

The World Steel Association's key areas of activity include:

Safety and health:

The World Steel Association promotes a policy that ensures zero harm to any employee or contractor of the steel industry. The aim is to achieve an accident-free workplace across the industry.

Climate change:

The World Steel Association has developed a global approach to tackle climate change. The World Steel Association has a policy paper on the subject of climate change and the production of iron and steel.

Economics:

The association publishes monthly production statistics and two annual statistics: the Steel Statistical Yearbook and World Steel in Figures. Information on future trends is published twice a year, in the form of a short range outlook for steel demand.

Sustainability:

The association and its member companies have formulated a policy on sustainable development to measure the industry's economic, environmental and social performance. The World Steel Association publishes a sustainability report every year. 

Automotive:

The World Auto Steel programme stimulates innovation and the use of steel in the automotive sector.

Technology:

Modern steelmaking relies on advanced technologies. worldsteel plays an important role in benchmarking best practices, helping its members improve their businesses. Representatives from member companies meet regularly to exchange information on technological, manufacturing and operational performance.

History

The World Steel Association was founded as the International Iron and Steel Institute (IISI) in Brussels, Belgium on 10 July 1967. IISI opened a second office in Beijing, China, in April, 2006. The organisation changed its name to World Steel Association in October, 2008.

See also
List of European countries by steel production

References

External links
steelFACTS
The white book of steel 
 The Steel Story
 Ultralight Steel
worldsteel.org
worldautosteel.org
steeluniversity.org
constructsteel.org

International organisations based in Belgium
Steel
International trade organizations
Organizations established in 1967
1967 establishments in Belgium